Brandon McClelland (born Penrith, New South Wales, Australia) is an Australian stage, television and film actor. He is best known for his portrayal of Pat Dooley in ANZAC Girls.

Early life
McClelland was born in Penrith, New South Wales before moving to Batemans Bay, New South Wales, his long-time home town. He attended the National Institute of Dramatic Art in 2010, and graduated in 2012.

Credits

Film & Television

Theatre

Awards and nominations

References

External links
 IMDB Profile: Brandon McClelland 

Australian male television actors
Living people
National Institute of Dramatic Art alumni
1992 births